The Margolis Brown Adaptors Company (MBAC) is an internationally touring physical theatre company that also houses the Margolis Method Training Center now located in Highland, New York.  It was established in New York City in 1984 by Kari Margolis and Tony Brown.  As co-artistic directors, Margolis and Brown have thus far co-authored, directed, and sometimes performed in 16 full-length theatrical productions, as well as numerous site-specific works at such places as the Brooklyn Museum, Coney Island, and the historic John A. Roebling Suspension Bridge on the Delaware River.

The MBAC were artists in residence at the Brooklyn Arts and Culture Association (BACA) in New York City from 1985 to 1990.  In 1987 they established an independent performance space and multimedia center in Brooklyn and mounted four original productions there. The company has toured nationally and internationally to Barcelona, Berlin, London, Singapore and throughout Canada and Mexico. The company relocated to Minneapolis, Minnesota, in 1993. There they continued to create and produce multimedia theater productions and trained actors in the Margolis Method for over 12 years.  MBAC established an international training center in Sullivan County, New York in 2005 and divide their time between New York and Minneapolis.  From 2005 thru 2010 the Company divided its time between both sites.  In 2011, the Company and Training Center have moved all operations to the Highland NY site.

Performances
MBAC theatrical productions are collaboratively written original performance works produced by the company.  Productions are characterized by frequent utilization of multimedia and sparse text, thereby relying on unconventional means of dramatic conveyance.  Examples of those alternative dramatic vehicles are projected images, prerecorded or live sound, or an actor's physicality.  In addition, the actors often appear in non-representational dramatic situations.

Performance History

Autobahn - 1985, BACA, Brooklyn, NY
The Bed Experiment - 1987, BACA, Brooklyn, NY
Decodance - 1988, BACA, Brooklyn, NY
In Search of Planet Eden or Sodom by the Sea - 1989, Coney Island, Brooklyn, NY
Suite Sixteen - 1990, BACA, Brooklyn, NY
The Dilemma of Desmodus & Dyphilla - 1991, Arts Awareness, Lexington, NY
Koppelvision - 1992, St Clement's Church, New York, NY
Cafe Paradise - 1993, Second Story Theatre, Brooklyn, NY
Vidpires - 1995, The Southern Theater, Minneapolis, MN
Vanishing Point - 1996, The Southern Theater, Minneapolis, MN
The Time of Your Life - 1998, Minnesota Science Museum, Saint Paul, MN
Starry Messenger - 1999, Children's Theatre Company, Minneapolis, MN
American Safari - 2000, The Red Eye Theater, Minneapolis, MN
Sleepwalkers - 2002, O'Shaugnessy Auditorium, St Paul, MN
The Human Show - 2005, Intermedia Arts, Minneapolis, MN
Cyclopedia - 2008, Illusion Theatre, Minneapolis, MN; Just Off Broadway Theater, Kansas City, MO; Baltimore Theatre Project, Baltimore, MD
In Search of Tonto Blue - 2010, 7 Stages, Atlanta, GA; Baltimore Theatre Project, Baltimore, MD; Illusion Theatre, Minneapolis, MN

Margolis Method

Margolis has developed a physically based approach to performance called the Margolis Method.  The method, along with 25 years of personal research, takes inspiration from the research of such artists as  Etienne Decroux, Bertolt Brecht, and Jerzy Grotowski. The method's goal is to analyze and focus the dramatic force and emotion created by an actor's physicality to further the creative and expressive process.  It seeks to empower the actor to work simultaneously as a director, playwright and performer.

The Margolis Method was developed in response to what Margolis saw as a fragmented and ineffective way of teaching actors in America.  Pedagogically, Margolis rejected the notion that actor training could be broken down into separate contexts (i.e.: stage "voice" and "movement" classes) and instead suggested that all aspects of actor training are inextricably linked.  Rather than focusing primarily on establishing character through developing the character's psychological motivations and emotional states, Margolis sought ways to approach drama and character from a physical perspective as well.  To accomplish this, Margolis Method focuses on theatrical notions like conflict, timing, and neutrality and employs concepts borrowed from physics, such as inertia, lines of force and density (as well as concrete manifestations of these principles, such as: pendulums, pulleys and elastics).

Residency and Workshop Sites
 Master teacher for Kennedy Center American College Theater Festival (2000 -2010)
 Master teacher for Phoenix Fringe Festival, Arizona State University
 Millikin University
 Master Teacher for Rocky Mountain Theatre Association Festival
 Association of Professional Actors and Directors of Catalunya, Barcelona (2010, 2008, 2006) 
 Towson University MFA Program
 University of Maryland, Baltimore County
 The University of Missouri Kansas City
 Master Teacher Cos ’06 International Theatre Festival, Reus, Spain
 University of Nevada Las Vegas
 Luther College, 
 Saint Mary's University, Winona, MN 
 Ringling Brothers Clown College, WI
 Theatre Mu, Minneapolis, MN 
 George Mason University 
 Montclair State University
 Viterbo University, La Crosse, WI
 University of Wisconsin–Stevens Point

References

Other Sources
Barnes, C. “Autobahn: Life in The Fast Lane,”  New York Post  December 26, 1986

Potter, N., ed. (2002) ‘’Movement for Actors’’  pp. 173-186  New York:  Allworth Press

External links
- Margolis Brown ADAPTORS official website
- Margolis Method Center official website

Theatre companies in New York (state)
Drama schools in the United States
Physical theatre
Mimes
American multimedia artists